Lorne Abony (born August 26, 1969) is a Canadian businessman, currently the CEO of FastForward Innovations, Ltd, a venture capital  firm.

Life and career

Abony was born and raised in Toronto. After graduating from the University of Windsor law school in 1994, Abony practiced corporate and securities law at the Toronto firm Aird & Berlis. In his role as CEO and founder of a number of successful ventures, Abony has raised over C$1.3 billion through the public and private debt and equity markets, including over $100 million for Petopia.com, $190 million for FUN Technologies and over $820 million for Mood Media.

He is also the founder of EdTech companies Vemo Education and Schoold and currently serves on Vemo's board as Non Executive Chairman.  Abony previously owned the Orange County Breakers, a professional sports franchise which competes in World TeamTennis.

Abony is the former CEO of Mood Media Corporation, a public company listed on the Toronto Stock Exchange and the London Stock Exchange.  He co-founded FUN Technologies in 2001 and in 2004 as CEO of FUN became the youngest CEO of a listed company on the Toronto Stock Exchange (TSX). Additionally, Abony is a tennis player and is a former member of the Competition Committee of the Association of Tennis Professionals (ATP).

Abony was named CEO of FastForward Innovations, Ltd. on January 27, 2016.

Petopia.com 

In January 1998, Abony founded and served as the initial president of the online pet-supply business Paw.net in San Francisco. The company, which was eventually renamed Petopia.com, grew to 200 full-time employees within two years and raised over $114 million in financing. Petopia.com was sold to Petco in 2001.

FUN Technologies 
In 2002, Abony co-founded Columbia Exchange Systems Software PLC with Andrew Rivkin after the two raised C$1.8 million from initial investors. Later renamed FUN Technologies, Abony became the company's CEO and the largest individual shareholder. In 2003, FUN completed an IPO on the London Stock Exchange raising over $11 million. Soon after, FUN listed its shares on the TSX raising over $56 million from a group of investors including Fidelity Investments, AGF Management and the Ontario Teachers Pension Fund. FUN became one of the fastest growing companies on the TSX and in three years raised over $160 million in five rounds of equity financing. FUN and its subsidiaries acquired seven businesses during Abony's tenure as CEO, including SkillJam Technologies Corporation, Don Best Sports, Fanball Interactive LLC, Octopi Inc., Teagames, WorldWinner Inc. and Fantasy Sports Inc.

The Meridian, Colorado-based Liberty Media acquired a majority interest in FUN Technologies stock in 2005. Liberty Media purchased the rest of FUN Technologies in late 2007. The company was valued at nearly C$500 million at the time of its final sale to Liberty Media.

Orange County Breakers 
Abony was the owner of the Orange County Breakers for three seasons, selling the team in February 2017. The Breakers is one of eight professional tennis teams in World TeamTennis, the professional tennis league co-founded by Billie Jean King in 1974.

Mood Media 
Abony is the former CEO of Mood Media Corporation ("Mood Media"). Mood Media provides in-store media to over 575,000 locations worldwide, including clients such as McDonald's, Gucci, H&M, Abercrombie & Fitch, Nike, Hilton Hotel and AT&T. Mood Media has offices in 48 countries employs over 2,700 employees and plays over 115 million songs and 10 million on-hold and on-premise messages daily.
In 2011 Mood Media was named Canada's fastest growing company by Profit.
Mood Media currently has a market cap value of approximately $176 million.

In January 2013, Abony was featured in the CBS series Undercover Boss.

Green Dot (German: Der Grüne Punkt) Duales System Deutschland GmbH (DSD) 

Abony was part of the private equity syndicate that acquired Der Grüne Punkt (The Green Dot) "DSD" from Kohlberg Kravis Roberts in 2011. Abony sits on the board of DSD and is one of its largest shareholders. DSD was founded in 1990 and was the first company to introduce a dual take-back system in Germany, in response to the Packaging Ordinance & Waste Act. The Green Dot is the license symbol of a European network of industry-funded systems for recycling the packaging materials of consumer goods. The logo is trademark protected worldwide. DSD employs 247 people in Germany, and is considered the largest dual take-back systems provider in Europe. In 2009, DSD recovered approximately 2.75 million tons of sales packaging, saved 60 billion megajoules of energy and reduced CO2 emissions (and its equivalents) by 1.5 million tons. According to Reuters, DSD a former non-profit organization, had 2009 sales of 684 million euros.

Education, academia and awards
Abony earned an MBA from Columbia Business School, an LL.B/J.D. from the International Law Center at the University of Windsor and a B.A. from McGill University. He is a recipient of Canada's Top 40 Under 40 award and an Ambassador for the Province of New Brunswick and in 2006 was a recipient of the University of Windsor's Odyssey award.

Tennis

ATP
In August 2012, Abony was selected as one of two Players Representatives to sit on the newly formed 6-member Competition Committee of the ATP. The Competition Committee is composed of distinguished members of the international tennis community including former Wimbledon champion Richard Krajicek. The Competition Committee was created to "explore new and creative ideas for enhancing the competition and presentation of the sport."

Competitive tennis
Abony is a competitive tennis player. He was a member of the Team Canada men's tennis team  which competed in the 2009 Maccabiah Games in Israel.  He also competes in both the ITF and USTA men's over-40 divisions in both the state and national level in both singles and doubles. Abony's doubles' partner in the men's over-40 category is Jared Palmer, formerly the world #1-ranked doubles player and Wimbledon and Australian Open doubles champion. As of July 3, 2012, Abony, along with tennis partner Jared Palmer, is ranked #2 in the USTA's National Men's over-40 Team Doubles rankings.

In March 2014, Abony and doubles partner Robert Kendrick reached the finals of the USTA National Hardcourt Championships in the men’s over 30 category .

In June 2014, Abony and doubles partner Robert Kendrick won the USTA National Indoor Championship in the men's over 35 category.

References

1969 births
Businesspeople from Toronto
Canadian chief executives
Jewish Canadian sportspeople
Columbia Business School alumni
Competitors at the 2009 Maccabiah Games
Living people
McGill University alumni
University of Windsor alumni
Lawyers in Ontario
Canadian media executives
20th-century Canadian philanthropists
21st-century Canadian businesspeople
University of Windsor Faculty of Law alumni
Participants in American reality television series
21st-century Canadian philanthropists